The 2001–02 Croatian First Football League was the eleventh season of the Croatian First Football League since its establishment in 1992. NK Zagreb became champions for the first time, and were the first and until 2017 only league winners from outside the Eternal Derby rivalry. The campaign began on 28 July 2001 and ended on 4 May 2002. The league expanded to 16 teams (from 12 in the previous season), and was contested by all the 12 teams who competed in the previous season plus four newly promoted ones from Croatian Second Football League.

The first goal of the season was scored by Dinamo Zagreb's Dario Zahora against newly promoted TŠK Topolovac in the 13th minute of the game on the opening day of the season on 28 July. Miljenko Mumlek of Varteks scored the first hat-trick of the season against Hajduk Split, two of them from penalty kicks, at Poljud on 17 August 2001.

NK Zagreb clinched their first ever title after they drew 0–0 against Čakovec and their last competitor for the title Hajduk Split lost 1–0 to Hrvatski Dragovoljac in the penultimate 29th round of the season which took place on 27 April 2002. It was the third Croatian First Football League title for NK Zagreb manager Zlatko Kranjčar, who thus became the first manager to have won the Prva HNL in charge of two different clubs (in 1996 and 1998 he clinched two championship titles with Croatia Zagreb, renamed Dinamo Zagreb in 2000). The top goalscorer of the season was Ivica Olić with 21 goals scored in 29 appearances for NK Zagreb.

Promotion and relegation 
Since it had been decided that the league would expand to 16 teams for the 2001–02 season, only Marsonia were in danger of relegation, having finished last the previous season. Marsonia then played second level side Solin in a two-legged promotion/relegation playoff on 3 and 10 June 2001. The aggregate score was 5–5, but Marsonia won the tie on away goals rule, so no team were relegated.

Teams promoted from 2000–01 Croatian Second Football League:
 Winners: Kamen Ingrad
 Second place: Pomorac
 Fourth place: Zadar
 Fifth place: TŠK Topolovac (Agreed to host home matches at Gradski stadion in the nearby town of Sisak as their own ground was deemed unfit for first-league football.)

Summaries 
The following is an overview of teams which competed in the 2001–02 Prva HNL. The list of managers is correct as of 27 July 2001, the first day of the season.

Managerial changes

League table

Relegation play-offs 
First legs were held on 15 May and second legs on 19 May, 2002.

Results

Top goalscorers 

Source: 1.hnl.net

See also 
2001–02 Croatian Second Football League
2001–02 Croatian Football Cup

References

External links 
Season statistics at HRNogomet
2001–02 in Croatian Football at Rec.Sport.Soccer Statistics Foundation

Croatian Football League seasons
Cro
Prva Hnl, 2001-02